Lego Alpha Team is a 2000 puzzle video game developed by Digital Domain and published by Lego Media in September 2000 for Microsoft Windows. A Game Boy Color adaption of the game was developed by Climax Studios and published in November 2000. It was originally known by its working title Lego Action Team.

The game follows Agent Dash, who has to rescue the other Alpha Team members from Ogel and stop production of the mind control orbs. After rescuing an agent, they are playable in some levels as well. During development, the game held the working title Lego Logic and the team's name was "TILT" (Trans-International Lego Team).

Lego Media announced its partnership with Digital Domain in October 1998.

References

Alpha Team
2000 video games
Game Boy Color games
NetImmerse engine games
Puzzle video games
Video games developed in the United Kingdom
Video games developed in the United States
Video games scored by Matthew Simmonds
Windows games